Oncology Nursing Forum is a bimonthly peer-reviewed nursing journal covering oncology nursing. It was established in 1977 and is published by the Oncology Nursing Society. The editor-in-chief is Debra Lyon. According to the Journal Citation Reports, the journal has a 2019 impact factor of 1.728.

References

External links 
 

Publications established in 1977
Oncology nursing journals
Bimonthly journals
English-language journals
Academic journals published by learned and professional societies